Barbara Stuart (born Barbara Ann McNeese; January 3, 1930 – May 15, 2011) was an American actress.

Barbara Stuart starred as Violet Ryder in the Perry Mason episode “The Guilty Clients” in 1961.

Early years 
Born in Paris, Illinois, Stuart was raised in Hume, Illinois. Following her high school graduation, she studied acting at the Schuster-Martin School of Drama in Cincinnati before moving to New York  City, where she studied under Uta Hagen and Stella Adler.

Career
On stage, Stuart performed in the national touring company of Lunatics and Lovers. In the early 1960s, she was a showgirl in Las Vegas. She also appeared in the films Marines, Let's Go (1961), Hellfighters (1968), Airplane! (1980), Bachelor Party (1984), and Pterodactyl Woman from Beverly Hills (1997).

Stuart's roles in TV programs include those shown in the table below:

In the early 1990s, Stuart performed in dinner theaters.

Personal life and death
Stuart married actor Dick Gautier in 1967. Their honeymoon was canceled by her hospitalization for a blood clot in her leg. She was in the hospital for eight months as the clot moved to her lung and she developed pneumonia.

On May 15, 2011, she died at a nursing home in St. George, Utah, aged 81.

References

External links
 
 
 

1930 births
2011 deaths
20th-century American actresses
American film actresses
American stage actresses
American television actresses
Actresses from Illinois
21st-century American women